Tomas Krister Oneborg (28 March 1958 – 29 March 2020) was a Swedish photographer.

Biography
Oneborg was born in Hägersten outside Stockholm and was employed as a press photographer at Svenska Dagbladet from 1986 until his death. His photos of the aftermath of the 2017 Stockholm truck attack, which left five people dead, were awarded a second place prize at Photo of the Year.

Oneborg died at his home in Stockholm on 29 March 2020 of COVID-19.

References

1958 births
2020 deaths
20th-century Swedish photographers
21st-century Swedish photographers
Deaths from the COVID-19 pandemic in Sweden
Artists from Stockholm